Hennadiy Vasilyev (born on 10 March 1953) is a People's Deputy of Ukraine of the 2nd, 3rd, 4th, 6th, 7th convocations, and a member of the Party of Regions faction in the parliament while staying formally unaffiliated.

Biography

Hennadiy Vasilyev was born in Donetsk. In 1976, he graduated from the Kharkiv Law Institute with a PhD in law. His father Andrei Antonovich was an engineer, and his mother Anna Omelyanovna was a nurse.

Career

 1976-1979 - trainee investigating officer in the prosecutor's office in the Leninsky district of Donetsk
 1979-1981 - Executive assistant to prosecutor of the Leninsky district of Donetsk
 January - May 1981 - Prosecutor of the Investigation Department, prosecutor-criminalist of the Donetsk regional Prosecutor's office
 1981-1984 - Prosecutor of the Leninsky district of Donetsk
 1984-1987 - Head of Investigation Department of the Prosecutor's office of Donetsk region
 1987-1988 - Deputy Head of Investigation Department, Head of general supervision department of the USSR Prosecutor's Office
 1988-1991 - Deputy Prosecutor of the Donetsk region
 1991-1996, 1997-1998 - Prosecutor of the Donetsk region
 1994-1998 - People's Deputy of Ukraine of the 2nd convocation. Member of the Committee on Law and Order. Member of the "Independent" group.
 2002-2003 - First Deputy Chairman of the Verkhovna Rada of Ukraine
 2003-2004 - General Prosecutor of Ukraine
 2003-2005 - Member of the Crisis Center
 Since January 2005 - Member of the Derzhava Party. Soon headed this political force.
 Since 2007 - People's Deputy of Ukraine, member of Party of Regions fraction.
 2010-2011 - Deputy Head of the Presidential Administration.
 Honorary chairman of the public organization known as "Spadshchyna Monomakha" (Heritage of Monomakh)
 Honored Lawyer of Ukraine, honored worker of Prosecutor's office of Ukraine

Vasilyev did not participate in the 2014 Ukrainian parliamentary election.

Family

Hennadiy Vasilyev is married, and has a son and a daughter.

References 

1953 births
Living people
Politicians from Donetsk
Yaroslav Mudryi National Law University alumni
Second convocation members of the Verkhovna Rada
Third convocation members of the Verkhovna Rada
Fourth convocation members of the Verkhovna Rada
Sixth convocation members of the Verkhovna Rada
Seventh convocation members of the Verkhovna Rada
Deputy chairmen of the Verkhovna Rada
General Prosecutors of Ukraine
Recipients of the Honorary Diploma of the Cabinet of Ministers of Ukraine